Jonathan S. Kreiss-Tomkins (born February 7, 1989) is a member of the  Alaska House of Representatives. A Democrat, he represents the state's 35th district, which encompasses many Southeast island communities including Hoonah, Sitka, Kake, Klawock, Craig, Angoon, and Petersburg.

Alaska House of Representatives

Committees
For the 30th Legislature, Kreiss-Tomkins is a member of the following committees:

 House State Affairs (Chair)
 House Community & Regional Affairs
 House Fisheries
 House Judiciary

Legislation
House Bill 216, sponsored by Kreiss-Tomkins, was signed into law on October 23, 2014, making each of the twenty Native languages in Alaska an official language of the state. The act, which was passed by large bipartisan majorities in both chambers, adds Inupiaq, Siberian Yupik, Central Alaskan Yup'ik, Alutiiq, Unangax, Dena'ina, Deg Xinag, Holikachuk, Koyukon, Upper Kuskokwim, Gwich'in, Tanana, Upper Tanana, Tanacross, Hän, Ahtna, Eyak, Tlingit, Haida, and Tsimshian languages as official languages of the state.

Political campaigns

2012 election

Due to the 2010 census redistricting, Bill Thomas, a state representative since 2004, was redrawn into a slightly altered district. Kreiss-Tomkins's hometown of Sitka fell into the 34th district and no other candidates from the Democratic party filed to run in the primary, so he decided to run for the seat. Kreiss-Tomkins dropped out of Yale University after three years to run.

The race was very close, and Kreiss-Tomkins won with 50.12% of the vote. After a recount that decreased his margin of victory from 34 votes to 32, the vote was finalized on December 3, 2012, almost a month after election day.

2014 election

In the 2014 midterm elections, Kreiss-Tomkins was reelected with 60% of the vote (3393 votes to 2288). His opponent was Petersburg Republican Steven Samuelson, who had lost twice before to Peggy Wilson of Wrangell in primaries. Kreiss-Tomkins was elected in a slightly altered district (renumbered as House District 35) that now included Petersburg and the northern end of Prince of Wales Island, but no longer covered Haines and Metlakatla.

Media coverage
After Kreiss-Tomkins's victory in 2012, The Nation wrote an article about him titled "Alaska's Lesson for the Left" and he later featured in Politico’s "How to Turn a Red State Purple".

Following the 2014 legislative session, during which Kreiss-Tomkins sponsored a successful bill that made Alaska's Native languages official, The Washington Post named him one of its "40 Under 40" of American politicians.

Personal life
As a freshman at Sitka High School in 2003, Kreiss-Tomkins attracted national attention as a major online organizer for the Howard Dean presidential campaign.

He is a long distance runner, winning the Alpine Adventure Race in 2009 and placing second in the Coyote Two Moon ultramarathon in 2010.

He is also a mountaineer and in 2009 he climbed the highest volcano in the world, Argentina’s Ojos del Salado, to conclusively measure its height against a neighboring peak in Chile.

Kreiss-Tomkins founded Outer Coast College and Alaska Fellows Program. In 2020, he co-founded Covid Act Now.

References

External links
 Alaska Democrats Page
 Alaska State Legislature Page
 Legislative Facebook Page
 Follow the Money Page
 Jonathan Kreiss-Tomkins at 100 Years of Alaska's Legislature

1989 births
21st-century American politicians
American cellists
American male long-distance runners
American male marathon runners
American mountain climbers
Living people
Democratic Party members of the Alaska House of Representatives
People from Sitka, Alaska
Yale University alumni